John Lindsay was a Scottish footballer who played as a left-half and an outside-left, most notably for Liverpool.

Career
Lindsay started his senior career with Partick Thistle in 1922. After suffering a serious knee injury, he switched to the Welsh side Rhyl Athletic for the 1927–28 season, and he scored 60 goals for the club. This brought him to the attention of English First Division side Liverpool, who signed him in April 1928. He made his Liverpool debut on 1 December 1928, starting the match in a 3–0 victory over Derby County. He scored his first goal for the club on 30 January 1929, in a 5–2 FA Cup fourth round replay defeat to Bolton Wanderers. He left the club when his contract expired in January 1930, having made 16 appearances in total for Liverpool. Lindsay then moved back to Wales, where he joined Swansea Town, before moving back to Rhyl Athletic in 1931. He later played in Northern Ireland for Bangor City and in Scotland for Lochgelly Amateurs.

References

Scottish footballers
Liverpool F.C. players
People from Cardenden
1900 births
Year of death missing
Place of death missing
Partick Thistle F.C. players
Broxburn United F.C. players
Rhyl F.C. players
Swansea City A.F.C. players
Bangor City F.C. players
Association football forwards
Association football midfielders
Footballers from Fife